This list is of the Natural Monuments of Japan within the Prefecture of Nara.

National Natural Monuments
As of 1 April 2021, twenty-four Natural Monuments have been designated, including three *Special Natural Monuments; Dorohatchō spans the prefectural borders with Mie and Wakayama.

Prefectural Natural Monuments
As of 1 May 2020, sixty-one Natural Monuments have been designated at a prefectural level.

Municipal Natural Monuments
As of 1 May 2020, forty-two Natural Monuments have been designated at a municipal level.

See also
 Cultural Properties of Japan
 Parks and gardens in Nara Prefecture
 List of Places of Scenic Beauty of Japan (Nara)
 List of Historic Sites of Japan (Nara)

References

External links
  Cultural Properties in Nara Prefecture

 Nara
Nara Prefecture